Phyllonorycter pyrifoliella is a moth of the family Gracillariidae. It is found in Austria, Bulgaria, Finland, Hungary, Latvia, Moldova, Poland,  Spain and Ukraine.

The larvae feed on Malus species. They mine the leaves of their host plant. They create a lower-surface tentifom mine.

References

pyrifoliella
Moths of Europe
Moths described in 1933